This is the discography for American hip hop artist Ras Kass.

Albums

Studio albums

Unreleased albums
Van Gogh (2001) (officially released in 2018)
Goldyn Chyld (2003) (officially released in 2014)

Collaboration albums
 The Horsemen Project (with the HRSMN) (2003)
Chinese Graffiti (with Jay 211 & Namebrand) (2007)
A.D.I.D.A.S. (All Day I Dream About Spittin') (with DJ Rhettmatic) (2010)
The Yellow Snow EP (with Doc Hollywood) (2011)
Spit No Evil (with Doc Hollywood) (2012)
Drop No Evil EP (with Louie Rubio) (2013)
Historic EP (with HRSMN) (2014)
Blasphemy (with Apollo Brown) (2014)
Breakfast at Banksy's (with Jack Splash as Semi Hendrix) (2015)
Jamo Gang EP (with El Gant and J57 as Jamo Gang) (2018)
Walking with Lions (with Jamo Gang) (2020)
The Last Ride (with the HRSMN) (2021)
Long Story Longer (with Yukmouth, Swifty McVay & Mrk Sx) (2021)

Compilation albums
Re-Up: The Compilation (2003)
Razzy Kazzy (2007)
The Endangered Lyricist (2010)
The Endangered Lyricist Vol. 2 (2010)
The Endangered Lyricist Vol. 3 (2011)

Mixtapes
Sampler on Ice (Promo Demo Tape) (1996)
The Van Gogh (Album Preview CD) (Hosted by DJ Doo Wop & DJ Kay Slay) (2001)
Goldyn Chyld (Album Preview CD) (Hosted by Kid Capri) (2002)
On the Run (Hosted by DJ Lt. Dan) (2003)
Run Away Slave Mixtape (Hosted by Tung Ha) (2003)
Guess Who's Back: Freestyles '05 Vol. 1 (2005)
Institutionalized (2005)
Revenge of the Spit (Hosted by DJ Dow Jones) (2006)
Eat or Die (2006)
Institutionalized Volume 2 (2008)
Quarterly (2009)
Barmageddon: The Mixtape (Hosted by DJ J-Ronin) (2012)
Barmageddon 2.0 (2014)
ChristMess (2014)
Refresher Course (2016)
Year End Closeout (2017)

Singles

Guest appearances

References

Discographies of American artists